is a district located in Niigata Prefecture, Japan.

As of July 1, 2019, the district has an estimated population of 14,025 with a density of 373 persons per km2. The total area is 37.58 km2.

Towns and villages 
The district consists of one town:

 Seirō

History 

 On January 1, 1947 - The town of Shibata became a city.
 On March 1955 - After it gained city status, Shibata absorbed the villages of Izumino (Ijimino or Ijikuni), Kawahigashi, Sugaya (Sugatani), Matsuura, Yonekura and Akatani (Agaya).
 On March 1956 - Some areas of the village of Kajikawa were absorbed into Shibata.
 On April 1959 - The village of Sasaki was absorbed into Shibata.
 On November 1, 1970 - The town of Toyosaka (part of Niigata as of March 21, 2005) gained city status.

Recent mergers 
 On July 7, 2003 - The town of Toyoura was merged into the expanded city of Shibata.
 On April 1, 2004 - The towns of Suibara and Yasuda, and the villages of Kyogase and Sasakami were merged to form the city of Agano.
 On May 1, 2005 - The town of Shiunji and the village of Kajikawa were also merged into the expanded city of Shibata.
 On September 1, 2005 - The town of Nakajō and the village of Kurokawa were merged to form the city of Tainai.

External links 
 新発田市・紫雲寺町・加治川村合併協議会
 中条町・黒川村合併協議会

Districts in Niigata Prefecture